The Royal Trust was a donation to the state proposed in a letter by King Leopold II of Belgium on 9 April 1900. In addition some properties were added to the donation in a letter of 15 November 1900. The Belgian government accepted the donation by law on 31 December 1903 (Belgian Monitor of 1 January 1904). When the King handed the Congo Free State over to the Belgian government on 28 November 1907, additional properties were added to the Royal Trust (law of 18 October 1908, published in the Belgian Monitor of 18 October 1908).

The King donated his properties, such as his lands, castles and buildings, to the Belgian nation. Leopold did not want them to be divided amongst his three daughters, each of which was married to a foreign prince. The donation was made on three conditions: the properties would never be sold, they would have to retain their function and appearance, and they would remain at the disposal of the successors to the Belgian throne. Since 1930, the Royal Trust is an autonomous public institution which operates completely independently (Royal decree of 9 April 1930 - Belgian monitor of 29 May 1930).

Properties

The Royal Palace of Brussels and the Royal Palace of Laeken are the property of the Belgian State and are not part of the Royal Trust. However the park surrounding the Royal Castle of Laeken and the Royal Greenhouses of Laeken do belong to the Royal Trust.

The Royal Trust also owns woods and land that it rents to private persons and semi-public institutions.

Used by the Royal Family 

 Belvédère Castle (private residence of King Albert II)
 Park of the Royal Castle of Laeken
 Royal Greenhouses of Laeken (used for state receptions etc.)
 Stuyvenberg Castle (former residence of Queen Fabiola)
 Villa Schonenberg (residence of Archduchess Astrid)
 Villa Clémentine (currently the house of Prince Laurent and his family) in Tervuren
 Ciergnon Castle (holiday retreat)
 Fenffe Castle (id.)
 Villers-sur-Lesse Castle (near Houyet, occasionally used as a hunting lodge)

Open as public parks (total of 7000 ha)

 Arboretum in Tervuren
 Dudenpark / Parc Duden in Forest
 Elisabethpark / Parc Elisabeth in Laeken
 Maria-Henriëttepark in Ostend
 Leopold II-park in Nieuwpoort
 Koloniale Tuin / Jardin Colonial in Laeken

Open to the public 

 Memorial Chapel for Queen Astrid of Belgium, in Küssnacht, Switzerland
 Japanese Tower in Laeken
 Chinese Pavilion in Laeken

Rented to golf clubs 

 Park and castle at Ravenstein in Tervuren
 Park of Ardenne Castle
 Golf course in Klemskerke near De Haan

Other 

Château of Val-Duchesse in Auderghem
Château Ferage / Feragekasteel
Koninklijke Villa (Royal Villa) in Ostend
15.5 km² farmland
48 km² woodland in Houyet
5 km² woodland in Postel
Terrains of the British School in Tervuren
Ponds of Boitsfort
Wellington-renbaan (Wellington racecourse) and "Noorse Stallen" (Norwegian Stables) in Ostend
Sports centre in Strombeek-Bever
dunes in De Panne
Offices in Brussels (Kunstberg / Mont des Arts)
Vier-Armenkruispunt / Carrefour des Quatre-Bras
Villers-sur-Lesse
...

Sources
 Royal Trust (Dutch)

External links
 Royal Trust on the website of the Belgian Royal Family

Belgian monarchy
1900s in Belgium
1903 establishments in Belgium
Organisations based in Belgium with royal patronage
Leopold II of Belgium